Irka (also Romanized as Īrkā) is a village in Mianrud Rural District, Chamestan District, Nur County, Mazandaran Province, Iran. At the 2006 census, its population was 220, in 58 families.

References 

Populated places in Nur County